Sir Louis-Olivier Taillon  (September 26, 1840 – April 25, 1923) was a Canadian lawyer and politician. He was the eighth  premier of Quebec, serving two separate terms.

Political career
Taillon's first term of office was just four days, from January 25 to January 29, 1887.  This term came at the end of the Conservative government of his predecessor John Jones Ross.  Ross had lost the 1886 Quebec election, but had tried to cling to power in a minority government for a few more months.

Taillon was Leader of the Opposition from 1887 until 1890, when he lost the 1890 election and his own seat.

He briefly returned to the practice of law, but following the removal of Liberal Honoré Mercier from office by the Lieutenant-Governor of Quebec, Taillon became minister without portfolio in the government of Charles-Eugène Boucher de Boucherville.  Taillon became premier when Boucher de Boucherville resigned. Taillon lost the 1890 election but continued as leader of the party.

He resigned in 1896 and moved into federal politics to serve as Postmaster-General in the very short-lived federal Conservative government of Charles Tupper, from May to July 1896.  He failed to gain a federal seat in the 1896 federal election, and likewise failed to secure a seat in the 1900 federal election, ending his political career. In 1916, he was made a Knight Bachelor.

Personal life
Taillon was born in Terrebonne, Lower Canada (now Quebec). He was the son of Aimé Taillon, a farmer, and Josephte Daunais. Taillon married Georgiana Archambault in 1875. Archambault and their child died shortly after the child's birth in January 1876.

By the 1920s, Taillon had lost his sight and by 1922 had cut off his beard, his political trademark. Taillon lived in the Institution des Sourdes-Muettes on Rue Saint-Denis in Montreal. Taillon died in 1923.

See also
Politics of Quebec
List of Quebec general elections
Timeline of Quebec history

References

External links
 
 

1840 births
1923 deaths
Canadian Knights Bachelor
Conservative Party of Canada (1867–1942) candidates for the Canadian House of Commons
Lawyers in Quebec
Members of the King's Privy Council for Canada
Premiers of Quebec
Presidents of the National Assembly of Quebec
Quebec political party leaders
People from Terrebonne, Quebec
Burials at Notre Dame des Neiges Cemetery